Li Meiyi ((born in Qiqihar) is a Chinese ladies pair skater. She skates with partner Jiang Bo.

Programs 
(with Jiang)

Competitive highlights 
Singles

Pairs
(with Jiang)

References

External links 

 
 
 

Living people
Chinese female pair skaters
Sportspeople from Qiqihar
1997 births
Figure skaters from Heilongjiang